Melvin James Wright Jr. (May 11, 1928 – May 16, 1983) was an American Major League Baseball pitcher, pitching coach and scout.

Wright was a longtime associate of former MLB center fielder and manager Bill Virdon. Originally signed by the New York Yankees in 1950, Wright was traded with Virdon to the St. Louis Cardinals on April 11, 1954, in a multiplayer transaction that sent eventual Baseball Hall of Fame outfielder Enos Slaughter to the Yanks. But while Virdon enjoyed a decade-plus-long Major League playing tenure, Wright spent most of his pitching career at the Triple-A minor league level. In 543 minor league games, he won 85 games, losing 61 with an earned run average of 3.01.

Wright appeared in 58 games with the Cardinals (1954–55) and Chicago Cubs (1960–61), winning two of six decisions, surrendering 119 hits in 84 innings pitched, and compiling a poor earned run average of 7.61.

On August 15, 1955, pitcher Warren Spahn of the Milwaukee Braves hit a home run off Wright, then with the St. Louis Cardinals, to give Spahn a home run in every National League park to that point.

Wright began his coaching career in 1962 with the Salt Lake City Bees of the Triple-A Pacific Coast League, then was a member of the Cubs' experimental College of Coaches in 1963–64 before becoming a Chicago scout, minor league pitching instructor, then Major League pitching coach for one season (1971) on the staff of Leo Durocher. In 1973, Virdon, then in his second and final season as manager of the Pittsburgh Pirates, named Wright as his Major League pitching coach. Virdon then appointed Wright to posts with the Yankees (1974–75, as bullpen coach), Houston Astros (1976–82) and Montreal Expos (1983).

However, Wright was suffering from cancer when Virdon asked him to join the Montreal coaching staff. He was hospitalized one week into the 1983 season and died of heart failure on May 16, in Houston, Texas, at age 55.

References

External links

1928 births
1983 deaths
Baseball players from Arkansas
Binghamton Triplets players
Chicago Cubs coaches
Chicago Cubs players
Chicago Cubs scouts
Columbus Red Birds players
Dallas Rangers players
Houston Astros coaches
Houston Buffs players
Joplin Miners players
Kansas City Blues (baseball) players
Major League Baseball bullpen coaches
Major League Baseball pitchers
Major League Baseball pitching coaches
McAlester Rockets players
Montreal Expos coaches
New York Yankees coaches
Ouachita Baptist University alumni
Omaha Cardinals players
Rochester Red Wings players
People from Manila, Arkansas
Pittsburgh Pirates coaches
St. Louis Cardinals players
Huron Cubs players